Lębork Nowy Świat is a PKP railway station in Lębork (Pomeranian Voivodeship), Poland.

Lines crossing the station

See also
Lębork

References 
Lębork Nowy Świat article at Polish Stations Database, URL accessed at 18 March 2006

Lebork Nowy Swiat
Lębork County